The IranRunner, also known as the ER24PC and Iran Safir is a single cab diesel electric passenger locomotive manufactured by the Mapna Locomotive Engineering and Manufacturing Company and Siemens.

History and design
In 2006 Siemens, Mapna and the Islamic Republic of Iran Railways agreed a contact for the supply of 150 four axle Bo'Bo'  locomotives for passenger train use. 30 of the locomotives were to be manufactured in Germany (Siemens. Munich), and the remaining 120 locomotives manufactured in Iran under a technology transfer agreement. The value of the contract was $450 million (€294 million).

The first locomotive was manufactured by Siemens in early 2010.

See also
Eurorunner
 Iranian locomotives

References

External links

Diesel-electric locomotives of Iran